Esso Birmingham Terminal is a wholesale diesel and petroleum supply terminal located next to the Fort Shopping Park, on Wood Lane in Erdington, Birmingham, UK. The site is also adjacent to the A47 Fort Parkway, otherwise known locally as the 'Heartlands Spine Road'.

Opened in 1962, the site consists of 17 fuel storage tanks, with a combined capacity of 50,000m³, operating 24 hours a day, 7 days a week.  The site used to be serviced by both rail and road up until the mid 2000s, however the rail connection beneath Fort Parkway has now been severed.

In 2014, it was discovered that a major fuel theft had taken place on the pipeline between the Birmingham Terminal, Birmingham Airport and Esso's oil refinery in Fawley, Southampton.  The pipeline had been breached near to an industrial unit in West Wellow, Romsey.

See also 
Kingsbury Oil Terminal
Oil terminals in the United Kingdom

References

External links 
Esso Wholesale Fuels UK

Oil terminals
Petroleum infrastructure in the United Kingdom
Birmingham, West Midlands